Roddino is a comune (municipality) in the Province of Cuneo in the Italian region Piedmont, located about  southeast of Turin and about  northeast of Cuneo.

The municipality of Roddino contains the frazioni (subdivisions, mainly villages and hamlets) Costepomo, San Lorenzo, Noé, Santa Maria, Pozzetti, Lopiano, Santa Margherita, and Corini.

Roddino borders the following municipalities: Cerreto Langhe, Cissone, Dogliani, Monforte d'Alba, Serralunga d'Alba, Serravalle Langhe, and Sinio.

Demographic evolution

References

Cities and towns in Piedmont